Karhu is a Finnish beer brand owned by the Sinebrychoff brewery, part of the Carlsberg Group. Karhu, meaning bear in Finnish, is a pale lager with a strong taste.

The brewing of Karhu began in 1929. , Karhu 4.6% had the sixth largest market share of all Finnish beers sold in shops and Karhu 5.3% the ninth. The original Pori Brewery was bought by Sinebrychoff in 1972. From 2006 the beer has been made in a new brewery in Kerava. The Pori brewery was closed in 2009.

Karhu beers 
Karhu's ingredients are water, barley, malt, barley starch and hops. The number in parentheses is alcohol percentage by volume (ABV).
 Karhu III (4.6% or 5.4%)
 Karhu A (5.3%)
 Karhu Real Strong (8.0%)
 Karhu Dark I (2.8%)
 Karhu Rye (4.6%)
 Karhu Double Hops (4.6%)
 Karhu Frosted (4.6%)

Marketing slogans

"Follow yourself."

"Karhu is a full-bodied beer."

"Every Karhu is a full-bodied beer from the first bite to the last drop."

"Untamed Karhu is the strongest of its breed."

"Uncap when frosty cold and enjoy the full-bodied flavour."

See also
 Beer in Finland

References

External links
  
 Oy Sinebrychoff Ab
 Carlsberg Group

Beer in Finland
Finnish brands